Central Europe is an area of Europe between Western Europe and Eastern Europe, based on a common geography, historical, social and cultural identity. The concept of "Central Europe" appeared in the 19th century.

Central Europe comprises most of the former territories of the Holy Roman Empire and those of the two neighboring kingdoms of Poland and Hungary. Hungary and parts of Poland were later part of the Habsburg monarchy. Unlike their counterparts in the rest of Europe, Central European powers historically had few colonies.

After World War II, Central Europe was divided by the Iron Curtain (as agreed by the Big Three at the Yalta Conference and the Potsdam Conference) into two parts, the capitalist Western Bloc and the communist Eastern Bloc. The Berlin Wall was one of the most visible symbols of this division.

Central Europe began a "strategic awakening" in the late 20th and early 21st century, with initiatives such as Central European Defence Cooperation, the Central European Initiative, Centrope, and the Visegrád Four Group. This awakening was triggered by writers and other intellectuals who recognized the societal paralysis of decaying dictatorships and felt compelled to speak up against Soviet oppression.

All of the Central European countries are presently listed as being "very highly developed" by the Human Development Index.

Historical perspective

Middle Ages and early modern period
Elements of cultural unity for Northwestern, Southwestern and Central Europe were Catholicism and Latin. However Eastern Europe, which remained Eastern Orthodox, was dominated by Byzantine cultural influence; after the East–West Schism in 1054, Eastern Europe developed cultural unity and resistance to Catholic (and later also Protestant) Western Europe within the framework of the Eastern Orthodox Church, Church Slavonic language, and the Cyrillic alphabet.

According to Hungarian historian Jenő Szűcs, the foundations of Central European history at the end of the first millennium were in close connection with Western European development. Szűcs argued that between the 11th and 15th centuries, not only Christianization and its cultural consequences were implemented, but well-defined social features emerged in Central Europe based on Western characteristics. The keyword of Western social development after the turn of the millennium was the spread of Magdeburg rights in some cities and towns of Western Europe. These began to spread in the middle of the 13th century in Central European countries, bringing about self-governments of towns and counties.

In 1335, the Kings of Poland, Bohemia and Hungary met in the castle of Visegrád and agreed to cooperate closely in the field of politics and commerce, inspiring the post-Cold War Visegrád Group.

Before World War I

Before 1870, the industrialization that had started to develop in Northwestern and Central Europe and the United States did not extend in any significant way to the rest of the world. Even in Eastern Europe, industrialization lagged far behind. Russia, for example, remained largely rural and agricultural, and its autocratic rulers kept the peasants in serfdom.
The concept of Central Europe was already known at the beginning of the 19th century, but its real life began in the 20th century and immediately became an object of intensive interest. However, the very first concept mixed science, politics and economy – it was strictly connected with the intensively growing German economy and its aspirations to dominate a part of European continent called Mitteleuropa. The German term denoting Central Europe was so fashionable that other languages started referring to it when indicating territories from Rhine to Vistula, or even Dnieper, and from the Baltic Sea to the Balkans. An example of that-time vision of Central Europe may be seen in Joseph Partsch's book of 1903.

On 21 January 1904, Mitteleuropäischer Wirtschaftsverein (Central European Economic Association) was established in Berlin with economic integration of Germany and Austria–Hungary (with eventual extension to Switzerland, Belgium and the Netherlands) as its main aim. Another time, the term Central Europe became connected to the German plans of political, economic and cultural domination. The "bible" of the concept was Friedrich Naumann's book Mitteleuropa in which he called for an economic federation to be established after World War I. Naumann's idea was that the federation would have at its centre Germany and the Austro-Hungarian Empire but would also include all European nations outside the Triple Entente. The concept failed after the German defeat in World War I and the dissolution of Austria-Hungary. The revival of the idea may be observed during the Hitler era.

Interwar period

According to Emmanuel de Martonne, in 1927 the Central European countries included: Austria, Czechoslovakia, Germany, Hungary, Poland, Romania and Switzerland. The author uses both Human and Physical Geographical features to define Central Europe, but he doesn't take into account the legal development or the social, cultural, economic, infrastructural developments in these countries.

The interwar period (1918–1938) brought a new geopolitical system, as well as economic and political problems, and the concept of Central Europe took on a different character. The centre of interest was moved to its eastern part – the countries that have (re)appeared on the map of Europe: Czechoslovakia, Hungary and Poland. Central Europe ceased to be the area of German aspiration to lead or dominate and became a territory of various integration movements aiming at resolving political, economic and national problems of "new" states, being a way to face German and Soviet pressures. However, the conflict of interests was too big and neither Little Entente nor Intermarium (Międzymorze) ideas succeeded. These matters were not helped by the fact that Czechoslovakia appeared alone as the only multicultural, democratic, and liberal state among its neighbors. The events preceding World War II in Europe—including the so-called Western betrayal/ Munich Agreement were very much enabled by the rising nationalism and ethnocentrism that typified that time period.

The interwar period brought new elements to the concept of Central Europe. Before World War I, it embraced mainly German states (Germany, Austria), non-German territories being an area of intended German penetration and domination – German leadership position was to be the natural result of economic dominance. After the war, the Eastern part of Central Europe was placed at the centre of the concept. At that time the scientists took an interest in the idea: the International Historical Congress in Brussels in 1923 was committed to Central Europe, and the 1933 Congress continued the discussions.

Hungarian historian Magda Ádám wrote in her study Versailles System and Central Europe (2006): "Today we know that the bane of Central Europe was the Little Entente, military alliance of Czechoslovakia, Romania and Kingdom of Serbs, Croats and Slovenes (later Yugoslavia), created in 1921 not for Central Europe's cooperation nor to fight German expansion, but in a wrong perceived notion that a completely powerless Hungary must be kept down".

The avant-garde movements of Central Europe were an essential part of modernism's evolution, reaching its peak throughout the continent during the 1920s. The Sourcebook of Central European avantgards (Los Angeles County Museum of Art) contains primary documents of the avant-gardes in Austria, Czechoslovakia, Germany, Hungary, and Poland from 1910 to 1930. The manifestos and magazines of Central European radical art circles are well known to Western scholars and are being taught at primary universities of their kind in the western world.

Mitteleuropa
Mitteleuropa may refer to an historical concept, or to a contemporary German definition of Central Europe. As an historical concept, the German term Mitteleuropa (or alternatively its literal translation into English, Middle Europe) is an ambiguous German concept. It is sometimes used in English to refer to an area somewhat larger than most conceptions of 'Central Europe'; it refers to territories under Germanic cultural hegemony until World War I (encompassing Austria–Hungary and Germany in their pre-war formations but usually excluding the Baltic countries north of East Prussia). According to Fritz Fischer Mitteleuropa was a scheme in the era of the Reich of 1871–1918 by which the old imperial elites had allegedly sought to build a system of German economic, military and political domination from the northern seas to the Near East and from the Low Countries through the steppes of Russia to the Caucasus. Later on, professor Fritz Epstein argued the threat of a Slavic "Drang nach Westen" (Western expansion) had been a major factor in the emergence of a Mitteleuropa ideology before the Reich of 1871 ever came into being.

In Germany the connotation was also sometimes linked to the pre-war German provinces east of the Oder-Neisse line.

The term "Mitteleuropa" conjures up negative historical associations among some elderly people, although the Germans have not played an exclusively negative role in the region. Most Central European Jews embraced the enlightened German humanistic culture of the 19th century. German-speaking Jews from turn of the 20th century Vienna, Budapest and Prague became representatives of what many consider to be Central European culture at its best, though the Nazi version of "Mitteleuropa" destroyed this kind of culture instead. However, the term "Mitteleuropa" is now widely used again in German education and media without negative meaning, especially since the end of communism. In fact, many people from the new states of Germany do not identify themselves as being part of Western Europe and therefore prefer the term "Mitteleuropa".

Central Europe during World War II
During World War II, Central Europe was largely occupied by Nazi Germany. Many areas were a battle area and were devastated. The mass murder of the Jews depopulated many of their centuries-old settlement areas or settled other people there and their culture was wiped out. Both Adolf Hitler and Joseph Stalin diametrically opposed the centuries-old Habsburg principles of "live and let live" with regard to ethnic groups, peoples, minorities, religions, cultures and languages and tried to assert their own ideologies and power interests in Central Europe. There were various Allied plans for state order in Central Europe for post-war. While Stalin tried to get as many states under his control as possible, Winston Churchill preferred a Central European Danube Confederation to counter these countries against Germany and Russia. There were also plans to add Bavaria and Württemberg to an enlarged Austria. There were also various resistance movements around Otto von Habsburg that pursued this goal. The group around the Austrian priest Heinrich Maier also planned in this direction, which also successfully helped the Allies to wage war by, among other things, forwarding production sites and plans for V-2 rockets, Tiger tanks and aircraft to the USA. So Otto von Habsburg also tried to detach Hungary from its grasp by Nazi Germany and the USSR. There were various considerations to prevent German power in Europe after the war. Churchill's idea of reaching the area around Vienna and Budapest before the Russians via an operation from the Adriatic had not been approved by the Western Allied chiefs of staff. As a result of the military situation at the end of the war, Stalin's plans prevailed and much of Central Europe came under Russian control.

Central Europe behind the Iron Curtain

Following World War II, large parts of Europe that were culturally and historically Western became part of the Eastern bloc. Czech author Milan Kundera (emigrant to France) thus wrote in 1984 about the "Tragedy of Central Europe" in the New York Review of Books. The boundary between the two blocks was called the Iron Curtain. Consequently, the English term Central Europe was increasingly applied only to the westernmost former Warsaw Pact countries (East Germany, Poland, Czechoslovakia, Hungary) to specify them as communist states that were culturally tied to Western Europe. This usage continued after the end of the Warsaw Pact when these countries started to undergo transition.

The post-World War II period brought blocking of research on Central Europe in the Eastern Bloc countries, as its every result proved the dissimilarity of Central Europe, which was inconsistent with the Stalinist doctrine. On the other hand, the topic became popular in Western Europe and the United States, much of the research being carried out by immigrants from Central Europe. Following the Fall of Communism, publicists and historians in Central Europe, especially the anti-communist opposition, returned to their research.

According to Karl A. Sinnhuber (Central Europe: Mitteleuropa: Europe Centrale: An Analysis of a Geographical Term) most Central European states were unable to preserve their political independence and became Soviet Satellite Europe. Besides Austria, only the marginal European states of Finland and Yugoslavia preserved their political sovereignty to a certain degree, being left out of any military alliances in Europe.

The opening of the Iron Curtain between Austria and Hungary at the Pan-European Picnic on 19 August 1989 then set in motion a peaceful chain reaction, at the end of which there was no longer an East Germany and the Eastern Bloc had disintegrated. It was the largest escape movement from East Germany since the Berlin Wall was built in 1961. After the picnic, which was based on an idea by Otto von Habsburg to test the reaction of the USSR and Mikhail Gorbachev to an opening of the border, tens of thousands of media-informed East Germans set off for Hungary. The leadership of the GDR in East Berlin did not dare to completely block the borders of their own country and the USSR did not respond at all. 
This broke the bracket of the Eastern Bloc and Central Europe subsequently became free from communism.

Roles
According to American professor Ronald Tiersky, the 1991 summit held in Visegrád, Hungary and attended by the Polish, Hungarian and Czechoslovak presidents was hailed at the time as a major breakthrough in Central European cooperation, but the Visegrád Group became a vehicle for coordinating Central Europe's road to the European Union, while development of closer ties within the region languished.

American professor Peter J. Katzenstein described Central Europe as a way station in a Europeanization process that marks the transformation process of the Visegrád Group countries in different, though comparable ways. According to him, in Germany's contemporary public discourse "Central European identity" refers to the civilizational divide between Catholicism and Eastern Orthodoxy. He says there is no precise, uncontestable way to decide whether Lithuania, Latvia, Estonia, Serbia, Croatia, Slovenia, Romania, or Bulgaria are parts of Central Europe.

Definitions

Rather than a physical entity, Central Europe is a concept of shared history that contrasts with that of the surrounding regions. The issue of how to name and define the Central European area is subject to debates. Very often, the definition depends on the nationality and historical perspective of its author.

Academic 

The main proposed regional definitions, gathered by Polish historian Jerzy Kłoczowski, include:

 West-Central and East-Central Europe – this conception, presented in 1950, distinguishes two regions in Central Europe: German West-Centre, with imperial tradition of the Reich, and the East-Centre covered by variety of nations from Finland to Greece, placed between great empires of Scandinavia, Germany, Italy and the Soviet Union.
 Central Europe as the area of cultural heritage of the Polish–Lithuanian Commonwealth – Ukrainian, Belarusian and Lithuanian historians, in cooperation (since 1990) with Polish historians, insist on the importance of the concept.
 Central Europe as a region connected to the Western civilisation since the foundation of the local states and churches, including countries such as the Polish–Lithuanian Commonwealth, Kingdom of Croatia, Holy Roman Empire, later German Empire and the Habsburg monarchy, the Kingdom of Hungary and the Crown of Bohemia. Central Europe understood in this way borders on Russia and South-Eastern Europe, but the exact frontier of the region is difficult to determine.

 Central Europe as the area of cultural heritage of the Habsburg Empire (later Austria-Hungary) – a concept which is popular in regions along the river Danube: Austria, the Czech Republic and Slovakia, Slovenia, large parts of Croatia, Romania and Serbia, also smaller parts of Poland and Ukraine. In Hungary, the narrowing of Central Europe into former Habsburg lands is not popular.
 A concept underlining the links connecting Belarus, Moldova and Ukraine with Russia and treating the Russian Empire together with the whole Slavic Orthodox population as one entity – this position is taken by the Russian historiography.
 A concept putting the accent on links with the West, especially from the 19th century and the grand period of liberation and formation of Nation-states – this idea is represented by the South-Eastern states, which prefer the enlarged concept of the "East Centre" expressing their links with Western culture.

Former University of Vienna professor Lonnie R. Johnson points out criteria to distinguish Central Europe from Western, Eastern and Southeast Europe:

 One criterion for defining Central Europe is the frontiers of medieval empires and kingdoms that largely correspond to the religious frontiers between the Catholic West and the Orthodox East. The pagans of Central Europe were converted to Catholicism while in Southeastern and Eastern Europe they were brought into the fold of the Eastern Orthodox Church.
 Multinational empires were a characteristic of Central Europe. Hungary and Poland, small and medium-size states today, were empires during their early histories. The historical Kingdom of Hungary was until 1918 three times larger than Hungary is today, while Poland was the largest state in Europe in the 16th century. Both these kingdoms housed a wide variety of different peoples.

He also thinks that Central Europe is a dynamic historical concept, not a static spatial one. For example, Lithuania, a fair share of Belarus and western Ukraine are in Eastern Europe today, but  years ago they were in Polish–Lithuanian Commonwealth. Johnson's study on Central Europe received acclaim and positive reviews in the scientific community. However, according to Romanian researcher Maria Bucur this very ambitious project suffers from the weaknesses imposed by its scope (almost 1600 years of history).

Encyclopedias, gazetteers, dictionaries 
The Columbia Encyclopedia defines Central Europe as: Germany, Switzerland, Liechtenstein, Austria, Poland, the Czech Republic, Slovakia, and Hungary. The World Factbook uses a similar definition and adds also Slovenia. Encarta Encyclopedia and Encyclopædia Britannica do not clearly define the region, but Encarta places the same countries into Central Europe in its individual articles on countries, adding Slovenia in "south central Europe".

The German Encyclopaedia Meyers Grosses Taschenlexikon (Meyers Big Pocket Encyclopedia), 1999, defines Central Europe as the central part of Europe with no precise borders to the East and West. The term is mostly used to denominate the territory between the Schelde to Vistula and from the Danube to the Moravian Gate. Usually the countries considered to be Central European are Austria, Croatia, the Czech Republic, Germany, Hungary, Liechtenstein, Poland, Slovakia, Slovenia, Switzerland; in the broader sense Romania and Serbia too, occasionally also Belgium, the Netherlands, and Luxembourg.

According to Meyers Enzyklopädisches Lexikon, Central Europe is a part of Europe composed of Austria, Belgium, the Czech Republic, Slovakia, Germany, Hungary, Luxembourg, Netherlands, Poland, Romania and Switzerland, and northern marginal regions of Italy and Yugoslavia (northern states – Croatia, Serbia and Slovenia), as well as northeastern France.

The German  (Standing Committee on Geographical Names), which develops and recommends rules for the uniform use of geographical names, proposes two sets of boundaries. The first follows international borders of current countries. The second subdivides and includes some countries based on cultural criteria. In comparison to some other definitions, it is broader, including Luxembourg, Croatia, Estonia, Latvia, Lithuania, and in the second sense, parts of Russia, Belarus, Ukraine, Romania, Serbia, Italy, and France.

Geographical 
There is no general agreement either on what geographic area constitutes Central Europe, nor on how to further subdivide it geographically.

At times, the term "Central Europe" denotes a geographic definition as the Danube region in the heart of the continent, including the language and culture areas which are today included in the states of Croatia, the Czech Republic, Hungary, Poland, Romania, Serbia, Slovakia, Slovenia and usually also Austria and Germany, but never Russia and other countries of the former Soviet Union towards the Ural mountains.

Governmental and standards organisations 
The terminology EU11 countries refer the Central, Eastern and Baltic European member states which accessed in 2004 and after: in 2004 Czech Republic, Estonia, Latvia, Lithuania, Hungary, Poland, Slovenia, and Slovakia; in 2007 Bulgaria, Romania; and in 2013 Croatia.

Map gallery

States
The comprehension of the concept of Central Europe is an ongoing source of controversy, though the Visegrád Group constituents are almost always included as de facto Central European countries. Although views on which countries belong to Central Europe are vastly varied, according to many sources (see section Definitions) the region includes the states listed in the sections below.

Austria
Czech Republic
Germany
Hungary
Liechtenstein
Poland
Slovakia
Slovenia
Switzerland

Depending on context, Central European countries are sometimes grouped as Eastern or Western European countries, collectively or individually but some place them in Eastern Europe instead: for instance Austria can be referred to as Central European, as well as Eastern European or Western European and Slovenia can sometimes be placed in either Southeastern or Eastern Europe.

Other countries and regions
Some sources also add regions of neighbouring countries for historical reasons (the former Austro-Hungarian and German Empires, and modern Estonia, Latvia and Lithuania), or based on geographical and/or cultural reasons:

Croatia (alternatively placed in Southeast Europe)
Romania (Transylvania, along with Banat, Crișana, Maramureș, Bukovina and Muntenia along with Oltenia)
Russia (Kaliningrad Oblast)
Serbia (primarily Vojvodina and Northern Belgrade)
Ukraine (Transcarpathia, Galicia and Northern Bukovina)
Luxembourg
 The three Baltic countries (Lithuania, Latvia, and Estonia), geographically in Northern Europe, have been considered part of Central Europe in the German tradition of the term, Mitteleuropa. Benelux countries are generally considered a part of Western Europe, rather than Central Europe. Nevertheless, they are occasionally mentioned in the Central European context due to cultural, historical and linguistic ties.
Italy (South Tyrol, Trentino, Trieste and Gorizia, Friuli, Lombardy, and Veneto or all of Northern Italy)
France (Alsace, Franconian Lorraine, occasionally the whole of Lorraine, Franche-Comté, the Ardennes and Savoy)
Belgium (the Ardennes).

Geography

Geography defines Central Europe's natural borders with the neighbouring regions to the north across the Baltic Sea, namely Northern Europe (or Scandinavia), and to the south across the Alps, the Apennine peninsula (or Italy), and the Balkan peninsula across the Soča–Krka–Sava–Danube line. The borders to Western Europe and Eastern Europe are geographically less defined, and for this reason the cultural and historical boundaries migrate more easily west–east than south–north. The river Rhine, which runs south–north through Western Germany, is an exception.

Southwards, the Pannonian Plain is bounded by the rivers Sava and Danube – and their respective floodplains. The Pannonian Plain stretches over the following countries: Austria, Croatia, Hungary, Romania, Serbia, Slovakia and Slovenia, and touches borders of Bosnia and Herzegovina and Ukraine ("peri- Pannonian states").

As southeastern division of the Eastern Alps, the Dinaric Alps extend for 650 kilometres along the coast of the Adriatic Sea (northwest-southeast), from the Julian Alps in the northwest down to the Šar-Korab massif, north–south. According to the Freie Universität Berlin, this mountain chain is classified as South Central European. The city of Trieste in this area, for example, expressly sees itself as a città mitteleuropea. This is particularly because it lies at the interface between the Latin, Slavic, Germanic, Greek and Jewish culture on the one hand and the geographical area of the Mediterranean and the Alps on the other. A geographical and cultural assignment is made.

The Central European flora region stretches from Central France (the Massif Central) to Central Romania (Carpathians) and Southern Scandinavia.

Demography

Central Europe is one of the continent's most populous regions. It includes countries of varied sizes, ranging from tiny Liechtenstein to Germany, the second largest European country by population. Demographic figures for countries entirely located within notion of Central Europe ("the core countries") number around 165 million people, out of which around 82 million are residents of Germany. Other populations include: Poland with around 38.5 million residents, Czech Republic at 10.5 million, Hungary at 10 million, Austria with 8.8 million, Switzerland with 8.5 million, Slovakia at 5.4 million, Slovenia with 2.1 million and Liechtenstein at a bit less than 40,000.

If the countries which are occasionally included in Central Europe were counted in, partially or in whole – Croatia (4.3 million), Romania (20 million), Lithuania (2.9 million), Latvia (2 million), Estonia (1.3 million), Serbia (7.1 million)  – it would contribute to the rise of between 25 and 35 million, depending on whether regional or integral approach was used. If smaller, western and eastern historical parts of Central Europe would be included in the demographic corpus, further 20 million people of different nationalities would also be added in the overall count, it would surpass the 200 million people figure.

Economy

Currencies
Currently, the members of the Eurozone include Austria, Croatia, Germany, Luxembourg, Slovakia, and Slovenia. The Czech Republic, Hungary and Poland use their own currencies (Czech koruna, Hungarian forint, Polish złoty), but are obliged to adopt the Euro. Switzerland uses its own currency (Swiss franc), as does Serbia (Serbian dinar) and Romania (Romanian leu).

Human Development Index

In 2018, Switzerland topped the HDI list among Central European countries, also ranking #2 in the world. Serbia rounded out the list at #11 (67 world).

Globalisation

The index of globalization in Central European countries (2016 data):
Switzerland topped this list as well (#1 world).

Prosperity Index

Legatum Prosperity Index demonstrates an average and high level of prosperity in Central Europe (2018 data). Switzerland topped the index (#4 world).

Corruption

Most countries in Central Europe tend to score above the average in the Corruption Perceptions Index (2018 data), led by Switzerland, Germany, and Austria.

Infrastructure
Industrialisation occurred early in Central Europe. That caused construction of rail and other types of infrastructure.

Rail

Central Europe contains the continent's earliest railway systems, whose greatest expansion was recorded in Austro-Hungarian and German territories between 1860-1870s. By the mid-19th century Berlin, Vienna, and Buda/Pest were focal points for network lines connecting industrial areas of Saxony, Silesia, Bohemia, Moravia and Lower Austria with the Baltic (Kiel, Szczecin) and Adriatic (Rijeka, Trieste). Rail infrastructure in Central Europe remains the densest in the world. Railway density, with total length of lines operated (km) per 1,000 km2, is the highest in the Czech Republic (198.6), Poland (121.0), Slovenia (108.0), Germany (105.5), Hungary (98.7), Serbia (87.3), Slovakia (73.9) and Croatia (72.5). when compared with most of Europe and the rest of the world.

River transport and canals
Before the first railroads appeared in the 1840s, river transport constituted the main means of communication and trade. Earliest canals included Plauen Canal (1745), Finow Canal, and also Bega Canal (1710) which connected Timișoara to Novi Sad and Belgrade via Danube. The most significant achievement in this regard was the facilitation of navigability on Danube from the Black sea to Ulm in the 19th century.

The economies of Austria, Croatia, the Czech Republic, Germany, Hungary, Poland, Slovakia, Slovenia and Switzerland tend to demonstrate high complexity. Industrialisation reached Central Europe relatively early: the Czech lands by 1797, Luxembourg and Germany by 1860, Poland, Slovakia and Switzerland by 1870, Austria, Croatia, Hungary, Liechtenstein, Romania, Serbia and Slovenia by 1880.

Agriculture
Central European countries are some of the most significant food producers in the world. Germany is the world's largest hops producer with 34.27% share in 2010, third producer of rye and barley, 5th rapeseed producer, sixth largest milk producer, and fifth largest potato producer. Poland is the world's largest triticale producer, second largest producer of raspberries, currants, third largest of rye, the fifth apple and buckwheat producer, and seventh largest producer of potatoes. Czech Republic is world's fourth largest hops producer and 8th producer of triticale. Hungary is world's fifth hops and seventh largest triticale producer. Serbia is world's second largest producer of plums and second largest of raspberries. Slovenia is world's sixth hops producer.

Business
Central European business has a regional organisation, Central European Business Association (CEBA), founded in 1996 in New York as a non-profit organization dedicated to promoting business opportunities within Central Europe and supporting the advancement of professionals in America with a Central European background.

Tourism
Central European countries, especially Austria, Croatia, Germany and Switzerland are some of the most competitive tourism destinations. Poland is presently a major destination for outsourcing.

Outsourcing destination
Kraków, Warsaw, and Wrocław (Poland), Prague and Brno (Czech Republic), Budapest (Hungary), Bucharest (Romania), Bratislava (Slovakia), Ljubljana (Slovenia), Belgrade (Serbia) and Zagreb (Croatia) are among the world's top 100 outsourcing destinations.

Education

Languages

Various languages are taught in Central Europe, with certain languages being more popular in different countries.

Education performance

Student performance has varied across Central Europe, according to the Programme for International Student Assessment. In the 2012 study, countries scored medium, below or over the average scores in three fields studied.

Higher education

Universities
The first university established east of France and north of the Alps was in Prague in 1348 by Charles IV, Holy Roman Emperor. The Charles University was modeled upon the University of Paris and initially included the faculty of law, medicine, philosophy, and theology.

Central European University

In 1991, Ernest Gellner proposed the establishment of a truly Central European institution of higher learning in Prague (1991–1995). Eventually, the Central European University (CEU) project is taken on and financially supported by the Hungarian philanthropist George Soros, who had provided an endowment of US$880 million, making the university one of the wealthiest in Europe. For example, during the academic year 2013–14, the CEU had 1,381 students from 93 countries and 388 faculty members from 58 countries. Consequently, the CEU becomes one of the leading graduate-level, English-language universities in Europe promoting a distinctively Central European perspective whilst emphasizing academic rigor, applied research, and academic honesty and integrity. In 2019, the Central European University leadership announced their preparatory work on moving CEU to Vienna due to socio-political and cultural constraints in Hungary.

Culture and society

Research
Research centres of Central European literature include Harvard University (Cambridge, MA), Purdue University, and Central European Studies Programme (CESP), Masaryk University, Brno, Czech Republic.

Architecture

Religion

Central European countries are mostly Catholic (Austria, Croatia, Liechtenstein, Luxembourg, Poland, Slovakia, Slovenia) or historically both Catholic and Protestant, (the Czech Republic, Germany, Hungary and Switzerland). Large Protestant groups include Lutheran, Calvinist, and the Unity of the Brethren affiliates. Significant populations of Eastern Catholicism and Old Catholicism are also prevalent throughout Central Europe.

Central Europe has been the center of the Protestant movement for centuries, with the majority of Protestants suppressed and annihilated during the Counterreformation.

Historically, people in Bohemia in today's Czech Republic were one of the very first Protestants in Europe. As a result of the Thirty Years' War following the Bohemian Revolt, many Czechs were either killed, executed (see for Old Town Square execution), forcibly turned into Roman Catholics, or emigrated to Scandinavia and the Low Countries. In the aftermath of the Thirty Years' War, the number of inhabitants in the Kingdom of Bohemia decreased from three million to only 800,000 due to multiple factors, including devastating ongoing battles such as the significant Battle of White Mountain and the Battle of Prague (1648). However, in recent years, most Czechs report as overwhelmingly non-religious, with some describing themselves as Catholic (10.3%).

Before the Holocaust (1941–45), there was also a sizeable Ashkenazi Jewish community in the region, numbering approximately 16.7 million people.

Currently, a number of Central European countries present themselves as more secular or non-religious, including a atheists, undeclared, and non-religious people. For example, people in the Czech Republic report the following figures (non-religious 34.2% and undeclared 45.2%), meanwhile persons in Germany (non-religious 38%), and Slovenia (atheist 14.7%), Luxembourg (23.4% non-religious), Switzerland (20.1%), Hungary (27.2% undeclared, 16.7% "non-religious" and 1.5% atheists), Slovakia (atheists and non-religious 13.4%, "not specified" 10.6%) Austria (19.7% of "other or none"), Liechtenstein (10.6% with no religion), Croatia (4%) and Poland (3% of non-believers/agnostics and 1% of undeclared).

Cuisine
Central European cuisine has evolved through centuries due to social and political change. Most countries share many dishes. The most popular dishes typical to Central Europe are sausages and cheeses, where the earliest evidence of cheesemaking in the archaeological record dates back to 5,500 BCE (Kuyavia region, Poland). Other foods widely associated with Central Europe are goulash and beer. The list of countries by beer consumption per capita is led by the Czech Republic, followed by Germany and Austria. Poland comes 5th, Croatia 7th and Slovenia 13th.

Human rights
Generally, the countries in the region are progressive on the issue of human rights: death penalty is illegal in all of them, corporal punishment is outlawed in most of them and people of both genders can vote in elections. However, Central European countries are divided on the subject of same-sex marriage and abortion. Austria, the Czech Republic, Germany, and Poland also have a history of participation in the CIA's extraordinary rendition and detention program, according to the Open Society Foundations.

Literature
Regional writing tradition revolves around the turbulent history of the region, as well as its cultural diversity. Its existence is sometimes challenged. Specific courses on Central European literature are taught at Stanford University, Harvard University and Jagiellonian University The as well as cultural magazines dedicated to regional literature. Angelus Central European Literature Award is an award worth 150,000.00 PLN (about $50,000 or £30,000) for writers originating from the region. Likewise, the Vilenica International Literary Prize is awarded to a Central European author for "outstanding achievements in the field of literature and essay writing".

Media

Sport
There is a number of Central European Sport events and leagues. They include:

Central European Tour Miskolc GP (Hungary)*
Central European Tour Budapest GP (Hungary)
2008 Central Europe Rally (Romania and Hungary)*
2023 Central Europe Rally (Germany, Austria and Czech Republic)
Central European Football League (Austria, Croatia, Hungary, Serbia, Slovakia, Slovenia and Turkey)
Central European International Cup (Austria, Czechoslovakia, Hungary, Italy, Poland, Switzerland and Yugoslavia; 1927–1960)
Central Europe Throwdown*

Football is one of the most popular sports. Countries of Central Europe hosted several major competitions. Germany hosted two FIFA World Cups (1974 and 2006) and the UEFA Euro 1988. Yugoslavia hosted the UEFA Euro 1976 before the competition expanded to 8 teams. Recently, the 2008 and 2012 UEFA European Championships were held in Austria & Switzerland and Poland & Ukraine respectively. The UEFA Euro 2024 will be hosted by Germany.

Politics

Organisations
Central Europe is a birthplace of regional political organisations:

Visegrád Group
Central European Defence Cooperation
Three Seas Initiative 
Centrope
Central European Initiative
Middleeuropean Initiative
Central European Free Trade Agreement

Democracy Index

Central Europe is a home to some of world's oldest democracies. However, most of them have been impacted by totalitarianism, particularly Fascism and Nazism. Germany and Italy occupied all Central European countries, except Switzerland. In all occupied countries, the Axis powers suspended democracy and installed puppet regimes loyal to the occupation forces. Also, they forced conquered countries to apply racial laws and formed military forces for helping German and Italian struggle against Communists. After World War II, almost the whole of Central Europe (the Eastern and Middle part) had been transformed into communist states, most of which had been occupied and later allied with the Soviet Union, often against their will through forged referendum (e.g., Polish people's referendum in 1946) or force (northeast Germany, Poland, Hungary et alia). Nevertheless, these experiences have been dealt in most of them. Most of Central European countries score very highly in the Democracy Index.

Global Peace Index

In spite of its turbulent history, Central Europe is currently one of world's safest regions. Most Central European countries are in top 20%.

Central European Time

The time zone used in most parts of the European Union is a standard time which is 1 hour ahead of Coordinated Universal Time. It is commonly called Central European Time because it has been first adopted in Central Europe (by year):
 Hungary 
 Slovakia 
 Czech Republic
 Germany 
 Austria 
 Poland (1893)
Serbia (1884)
 Slovenia 
 Switzerland 
 Liechtenstein

In popular culture
Central Europe is mentioned in the 35th episode of Lovejoy, entitled "The Prague Sun", filmed in 1992. While walking over the well-regarded and renowned Charles Bridge in Prague, the main character, Lovejoy, says: "I've never been to Prague before. Well, it is one of the great unspoiled cities in Central Europe. Notice: I said: 'Central', not 'Eastern'! The Czechs are a bit funny about that, they think of Eastern Europeans as turnip heads."

Wes Anderson's Oscar-winning film The Grand Budapest Hotel depicts a fictional grand hotel located somewhere in Central Europe which is in actuality modeled on the Grandhotel Pupp in Karlovy Vary in the Czech Republic. The film is a celebration of the 1920s and 1930s Central Europe with its artistic splendor and societal sensibilities.

See also

 Central and Eastern Europe
 Central European Initiative
 Central European Time (CET)
 Central European University
 East-Central Europe
 Eurovoc
 Geographical midpoint of Europe
 Life zones of central Europe
 Międzymorze (Intermarum)
 Mitteleuropa

References

Citations

General and cited references  
 
 
 
 
 
 
 
 
 
 
 Shared Pasts in Central and Southeast Europe, 17th–21st Centuries. Eds. G. Demeter, P. Peykovska. 2015

Further reading
 Ágh, Attila. Declining Democracy in East-Central Europe: The Divide in the EU and Emerging Hard Populism (Edward Elgar Publishing, 2019).
 Baldersheim, Harald, ed. Local democracy and the processes of transformation in East-Central Europe (Routledge, 2019).
 Brophy, James M. "Bookshops, Forbidden Print and Urban Political Culture in Central Europe, 1800–1850". German History 35.3 (2017): 403–430.
 Case, Holly. "The strange politics of federative ideas in East-Central Europe." Journal of Modern History 85.4 (2013): 833–866.
 Centre of Central European Studies, Agrarianism in Central and Eastern Europe in the 19th and 20th Centuries (2013) online review.
 Donert, Celia, Emily Greble, and Jessica Wardhaugh. "New Scholarship on Central and Eastern Europe". Contemporary European History 26.3 (2017): 507-507. DOI: New Scholarship on Central and Eastern Europe
 Gardner, Hall, ed. Central and South-central Europe in Transition (Praeger, 2000)
 
 Kenney, Padraic. "What is the history of 1989? New scholarship from East-Central Europe." East European Politics & Societies (1999), 13#2 pp 419–431.
 Lederer, David. Early Modern Central European History (2011) online review by Linnéa Rowlatt
 Margreiter, Klaus. "The Notion of Nobility and the Impact of Ennoblement on Early Modern Central Europe." Central European History 52.3 (2019): 382–401.
 Tieanu, Alexandra. "Shared Culture, Peace and Bridging: Western Influences on the Dissident Idea of Central Europe in the Communist States during the 1980s." Valahian Journal of Historical Studies 20 (2013): 215–232.
 Vachudova, Milada Anna. "From competition to polarization in central Europe: How populists change party systems and the European Union." Polity 51.4 (2019): 689–706. online
 Vachudova, Milada Anna. "Ethnopopulism and democratic backsliding in Central Europe." East European Politics 36.3 (2020) pp: 318–340. online
 Zimmerman, Andrew. "Race against Revolution in Central and Eastern Europe: From Hegel to Weber, from Rural Insurgency to “Polonization”." East Central Europe 43.1-2 (2016): 14–40.
 'Mapping Central Europe' in hidden europe, 5, pp. 14–15 (November 2005)

External links

 Journal of East Central Europe
 Central European Political Science Association's journal "Politics in Central Europe"
 CEU Political Science Journal (PSJ)
 Central European Journal of International and Security Studies 
 Central European Political Studies Review
 The Centrope region
 Maps of Europe and European countries
 CENTRAL EUROPE 2020 
 Central Europe Economy
 UNHCR Office for Central Europe

 
Regions of Europe